Alberto Martín and Daniel Muñoz de la Nava were the defending champions but only Muñoz de la Nava chose to defend his title, partnering David Marrero.

Marc López and Lamine Ouahab won the title after defeating Alessio di Mauro and Giancarlo Petrazzuolo 6–3, 7–5 in the final.

Seeds

Draw

References
 Main Draw

Meknes,Doubles
2009 Doubles